On May 21, 1996, an election was held in Portland, Oregon, to elect the mayor. Incumbent mayor Vera Katz was re-elected.

Portland uses a nonpartisan system for local elections, in which all voters are eligible to participate. All candidates are listed on the ballot without any political party affiliation. 

All candidates meeting the qualifications competed in a blanket primary election on May 21, 1996. Because Katz received a majority of the vote in the initial round, no runoff election was necessary.

Results

References

1996
1996 Oregon elections
Portland
1996 in Portland, Oregon